Juan Gazsó (19 November 1922 – 15 September 2003) was a Serbian-born Argentine basketball player who competed in the 1952 Summer Olympics. He was born in Telečka, Zapadna Bačka, Serbia.

References

1922 births
2003 deaths
Naturalized citizens of Argentina
Argentine men's basketball players
Olympic basketball players of Argentina
Basketball players at the 1952 Summer Olympics
Basketball players at the 1955 Pan American Games
Pan American Games medalists in basketball
Pan American Games silver medalists for Argentina
Medalists at the 1955 Pan American Games
Yugoslav emigrants to Argentina